Paraswammerdamia is a genus of moths of the family Yponomeutidae.

Species
Paraswammerdamia albicapitella - (Scharfenberg, 1805)
Paraswammerdamia conspersella - (Tengstrom, 1848)
Paraswammerdamia iranella - Friese, 1960 
Paraswammerdamia lapponica - Petersen, 1932 
Paraswammerdamia lutarea - Haworth, 1828
Paraswammerdamia ornichella - Friese, 1960 
Paraswammerdamia ruthiella - Steuer, 1993

Yponomeutidae